The Tourniquet is the third studio album by Norwegian musician Magnet, first released in Norway on 30 May 2005 where it debuted on the Norwegian Albums Chart at #2. The album was released in the United Kingdom on 22 August 2005, 31 August 2005 in Japan, and 14 February 2006 in the United States. The album is named after a drink called "the Tourniquet," which Even Johansen sampled "in a Singapore airport bar, en route back from Los Angeles" after recording there. The Tourniquet was Magnet's only album released by major label Atlantic Records.

There were two singles released from the album: "Hold On" in August 2005, and "Fall at Your Feet" in December 2005. The song "Believe" was scheduled to be released in 2006 as the third single, but was canceled. The Japanese CD edition of the album includes the bonus tracks "The Mute", "This Bird Can Never Fly" and "Good Mourning", while the American CD release contains the song "This Bird Can Never Fly" as a bonus track; the song also appeared as the B-side to "Fall at Your Feet".

Track listing

References

Magnet (musician) albums
2005 albums